Walter Jack Gotell (15 March 1924 – 5 May 1997) was a German actor, known for his role as General Gogol, head of the KGB, in the Roger Moore-era of the James Bond film series, as well as having played the role of Morzeny, a villain, in From Russia With Love. He also appeared as Gogol in the final part of The Living Daylights (1987), Timothy Dalton's debut Bond film.

Life and career
Gotell was born in Bonn; his family emigrated to Britain after the arrival of Nazism in Germany. A fluent English speaker, he started in films as early as 1943, usually playing villains and German officers, such as in We Dive at Dawn (1943). He began to have more established roles by the early 1950s, appearing in The African Queen (1951), The Red Beret (1953) for Albert R. Broccoli, Ice Cold in Alex (1958), The Guns of Navarone (1961), The Road to Hong Kong (1962), Lord Jim (1965), Black Sunday (1977), The Boys from Brazil (1978) and Cuba (1979).

His first role in the James Bond film series was in 1963, when he played the henchman Morzeny in From Russia with Love. From the late 1970s he played the recurring role of KGB General Anatol Gogol in the series, beginning with The Spy Who Loved Me (1977). Gotell gained the role of Gogol because of his resemblance to the former head of Soviet secret police Lavrentiy Beria. The character returned in Moonraker (1979), For Your Eyes Only (1981), Octopussy (1983), A View to a Kill (1985), and The Living Daylights (1987). As the Cold War neared its end, the role of leader of the KGB was seen to change attitudes to the West – from direct competitor to collaborator. Gotell is one of a few actors to have played a villain and a Bond ally in the film series (others being Charles Gray, Richard Kiel and Joe Don Baker).

Throughout his career, Gotell also made numerous guest appearances in television series including Danger Man, Knight Rider, The A-Team, Airline, Airwolf, The X-Files, Scarecrow and Mrs. King, MacGyver, Star Trek: The Next Generation, Miami Vice, Cagney & Lacey and The Saint among others. He played Chief Constable Cullen in Softly, Softly: Taskforce (1969–75).

Other television roles included that of Sam Baker, a KGB agent in the hard-hitting British police drama The Professionals (1978) -  the episode titled  "The Female Factor".

Personal life
Gotell was a businessman as well as an actor, and used his acting salaries to fund his business interests. He had one daughter, Carol, born in 1960. He died on 5 May 1997, at the age of 73.

Filmography

Film

 The Day Will Dawn (1942) as German Soldier (uncredited)
 The Goose Steps Out (1942) as SS Guard (uncredited)
 Secret Mission (1942) as Lieutenant Langfeld (uncredited)
 Tomorrow We Live (1943) as Hans
 We Dive at Dawn (1943) as Luftwaffe Captain (uncredited)
 Schweik's New Adventures (1943) as Captured resistance member
 The Night Invader (1943)
 Two Thousand Women (1944) as German Soldier (uncredited)
 No Orchids for Miss Blandish (1948) as Joe - Nightclub Doorman (uncredited)
 Cairo Road (1950) as Prison Officer
 The Wooden Horse (1950) as The Follower
 Lilli Marlene (1950) as Direktor of Propaganda
 The Man Who Disappeared (1951) as Luzatto
 The African Queen (1951) as the Second Officer of the Königin Luise
 Desperate Moment (1953) as Ravitch's Servant-Henchman
 The Red Beret (1953) as German sentry 
 Albert R.N. (1953) as Feldwebel
 Stryker of the Yard (1953) 
 Duel in the Jungle (1954) as Jim
 Above Us the Waves (1955) as German Officer on Tirpitz. (uncredited)
 Dial 999 (1956) as Policeman (uncredited)
 1984 (1956) as Guard (uncredited)
 The Man Who Knew Too Much (1956) as Matthews , Scotland Yard Patrol Car (uncredited)
 Ice Cold in Alex (1958) as 1st German Officer
 The Man Inside (1958) as Profuno
 I Was Monty's Double (1958) as German Colonel 
 The Bandit of Zhobe (1959) as Azhad
 No Safety Ahead (1959) (uncredited)
 The Treasure of San Teresa (1959) as Hamburg inspector
 Sink the Bismarck! (1959) as Signals Officer Miller on the Bismarck (uncredited)
 Circus of Horrors (1960) as Baron Von Gruber (uncredited)
 The Two Faces of Dr. Jekyll (1960) as Heverton - Second Gambler (uncredited)
 A Circle of Deception (1960) as Phoney Jules Ballard 
 The Guns of Navarone (1961) as Oberleutnant Muesel
 The Devil's Daffodil (1961) as Oberinspektor Whiteside / Supt. Whiteside
 Road to Hong Kong (1962) as Dr. Zorbb (3rd Echelon scientist)
 The Devil's Agent (1962) as Dr. Ritter
 The Longest Day (1962) as German Officer (uncredited)
 55 Days at Peking (1963) as Capt. Hoffman
 These Are the Damned (1963) as Major Holland
 Lancelot and Guinevere (1963) as Cedric
 From Russia with Love (1963) as Morzeny
 Lord Jim (1965) as Captain of Patna
 The Spy Who Came in From The Cold (1965) as Holten (uncredited)
 Attack on the Iron Coast (1968) as Van Horst
 Cry Wolf (1969)
 The File of the Golden Goose (1969) as George Leeds
 Our Miss Fred (1972) as Schmidt
 Endless Night (1972) as Constantine
 Black Sunday (1977) as Colonel Riat
 The Spy Who Loved Me (1977) as General Anatol Gogol
 The Assignment (1977) as Frankenheimer
 March or Die (1977) as Col. Lamont
 The Stud (1978) as Ben Khaled
 The Boys from Brazil (1978) as Mundt
 The Word (1978) as Hennig
 The London Connection (1979) as Simmons
 Moonraker (1979) as General Anatol Gogol
 Cuba (1979) as Don Jose Pulido
 Flygnivå 450 (1980) as Herbert Anchell
 For Your Eyes Only (1981) as General Anatol Gogol
 The Scarlet and the Black (1983) as SS-Obergruppenführer Max Helm (Karl Wolff) 
 Octopussy (1983) as General Anatol Gogol
 Kalabaliken i Bender (1983) as Storvesiren
 Memed My Hawk (1984) as Sgt. Asim
 A View to a Kill (1985) as General Anatol Gogol
 KGB: The Secret War (1985) as Nicholai
 Basic Training (1985) as Nabokov
 The Living Daylights (1987) as General Anatol Gogol
 Sleepaway Camp II: Unhappy Campers (1988) as Uncle John
 Wings of Fame (1990) as Receptionist
 Puppet Master III: Toulon's Revenge (1991) as General Müeller
 Prince Valiant (1997) as Erik the Old (final film role)

Television

 The Saint - episode - "The Hi-jackers" (1964) as Hans Lasser
 Walt Disney's Wonderful World of Color - 3 episodes - (1964 & 1979) as Benton / Simmons 
 Sherlock Holmes - episode - "Wisteria Lodge" (1968) as Henderson
 The Zoo Gang - episode - "Revenge: Post-Dated" (1974) as Boucher
 Softly, Softly: Task Force (1969-1975) - 55 episodes - as Chief Constable Arthur Cullen
 Hallelujah! as Lt. Colonel Henderson  
 The Professionals (6 January 1978), Series 1, episode 2 "The Female Factor" - as Baker
 Scarecrow and Mrs. King - episode - "Service Above and Beyond" (1983) as Kurt Hollander
 Airwolf - episode - "Fight Like a Dove" (1984) as Oberst Helmut Krüger / Hans Daubert
 Fantasy Island - episode - "Bojangles and the Dancer/Deuces Are Wild" (1984) as Edward C. Bass / Charles Childress 
 The A-Team - episode - "Where Is the Monster When You Need Him?" (1985) as Ramon DeJarro
Spenser for Hire - episode - "A Madness Most Discreet" (1986) as Max Claus
 Knight Rider - episode - "Knight Sting" (1985) as Simon Carascas
 MacGyver - episode - "GX-1" (1987) as Starkoss
 Miami Vice - episode - "When Irish Eyes Are Crying" (1986) as Max Klizer
 Star Trek: The Next Generation - episode - "Home Soil" (1988) as Kurt Mandl
 MacGyver - episode - "Gold Rush" (1989) as General Barenov
 The X-Files - episode - "Paper Clip" (1995) as Victor Klemper

Other appearances
 Inside 'From Russia with Love' - Video documentary short (2000) -  Himself / Morzeny

References

External links
 

1924 births
1997 deaths
Deaths from cancer in California
German male film actors
German male television actors
Actors from Bonn
People from the Rhine Province
Emigrants from Nazi Germany to the United Kingdom
20th-century German male actors